(November 19, 1944 – February 8, 2021) was an international table tennis player from Japan.

He won a bronze medal at the 1971 World Table Tennis Championships in the mixed doubles with Mieko Fukuno.

See also
 List of table tennis players
 List of World Table Tennis Championships medalists

References

1944 births
2021 deaths
Japanese male table tennis players
World Table Tennis Championships medalists